The Galicia women's football team is the official football team of the Spanish autonomous community of Galicia. It is organised by the Galician Football Federation. It is not affiliated with FIFA or UEFA and therefore it is only allowed to play friendly matches.

Results

Players

Current squad 
The following players were called up for the match against Catalonia on 22 December 2016.
Caps and goals as of 31 December 2016

Head coach: Pilar Neira

|-----
! colspan="9" bgcolor="#FFDEAD" align="left" | Goalkeeper
|----- bgcolor="#FFECCE"

|-----
! colspan="9" bgcolor="#B0D3FB" align="left" | Defender
|----- bgcolor="#E7FAEC"

|-----
! colspan="9" bgcolor="#BBF0C9" align="left" | Midfielder
|----- bgcolor="#DFEDFD"

|-----
! colspan="9" bgcolor="#FFACB3" align="left" | Forward
|----- bgcolor="#FFD2D6"

Recent call-ups

Notable players 
Galician players who represented FIFA international teams

See also
Galicia men's national football team

Football in Galicia (Spain)
Spanish autonomous women's football teams